Ukraine Is Not a Brothel is a 2013 Australian documentary film directed by Kitty Green. The film debuted at the 70th Venice International Film Festival, although it was not part of the competition.  The documentary concerns the FEMEN (Фемен) movement, a feminist protest group originating from Ukraine.

Content
The film is a documentary on the activities of FEMEN, a Ukrainian feminist movement known for topless protests. The filmmaker Kitty Green followed the activists for over a year, in Ukraine, Belarus and Turkey. It documents the protests and the resulting harassments and arrests over a span of fourteen months. The film showcases the four activists who form the core of the film.

The documentary shows Viktor Sviatsky as a driving force of the group FEMEN. He is the manipulator of all the protests and, in essence, commander of the females.

The activists of FEMEN participated in the promotion of the documentary. They claimed that the situation in the film, i.e. under the leadership of Viktor Sviatsky, is actually part of the past, since he was ejected from the movement in 2012.

Cast 

 Viktor Sviatsky
The four principal women of FEMEN (Фемен):
 Inna Shevchenko (Inna Ševčenko) (Інна Шевченко)
 Alexandra Shevchenko (Aleksandra Shevchenko) (Sasha Shevchenko) (Oleksandra Ševčenko)
  Anna Hutsol (Hanna Hucol) (Ганна Гуцол)
 Oksana Shachko (Oksana Šačko)

Release
The film was screened out of competition at the 70th Venice International Film Festival of Venice. At the festival photocall the activists appeared topless, as is usual for  their protests

Critical reception
Glenn Dunks and Christopher Schobert of The Playlist on IndieWire gave the film positive reviews.

Accolades
On 9 September 2014, Ukraine is Not a Brothel won for the Best Feature Length Documentary by Australian Academy of Cinema and Television Arts,  awarded at the 4th AACTA Awards at The Star Event Centre, Sydney, New South Wales in late January 2015

See also
 Security Service of Ukraine
 Prostitution in Europe § Ukraine
 Ost-Arbeiter § Ukrainian
 War crimes of the Wehrmacht § Wehrmacht brothel system
 Prostitution in Turkey
 List of Australian films of 2013

References

External links 
 
 
 

2013 films
2013 documentary films
Australian documentary films
Documentary films about feminism
Documentary films about Ukraine
Femen
Feminism in Ukraine